Sébastien Monier (born 15 June 1984, in Lomme) is a French-born footballer of Mauritian descent who currently plays for Royal Mouscron-Péruwelz in the Belgian Third Division.

Career
Monier began training as a youth at the Centre de Préformation in Liévin in 1997. Two years later, he moved to AJ Auxerre, playing for their various youth teams. During his time there, he did not make an appearance for the senior side. After 5 seasons, he decided to go a different route, signing with SR Delémont in Switzerland. 3 seasons later he moved to Ethnikos Piraeus F.C. in Greece. After only one season, he moved back to SR Delémont. In 2010, he signed with US Pont-de-Roide in the French CFA 2. One year later he moved again, joining Belgian side Royal Mouscron-Péruwelz of the Belgian Third Division.

International
Monier has not yet played for a national team, but has expressed his interest in playing for the Mauritius national football team, being eligible through his mother, who was born in Mauritius.

References

External links
 
 

Living people
1984 births
French people of Mauritian descent
French footballers
Mauritian footballers
SR Delémont players
Ethnikos Piraeus F.C. players
Association football midfielders